Party Time? is an EP by rapper Kurtis Blow, released in 1983 on Mercury Records. The title track and the song "Got to Dance" were both party-themed, but the other songs struck a sociopolitical tone.

The EP reached #36 on the R&B charts.

Track listing
  "Party Time" 9:30
  "Big Time Hood" 3:14
  "Nervous" 5:23
  "Got to Dance" 4:17
  "One-Two-Five (Main Street, Harlem, USA)" 5:11

References

1983 EPs
Kurtis Blow albums
Mercury Records EPs